Andrew Newman may refer to:
Andrew Newman (TV producer) (born 1969), British TV producer
Andrew J. Newman, Islamic studies scholar
Andrew Newman House, Massachusetts
Andy Newman (born 1978), Welsh rugby union player